Monaco competed at the 2018 Mediterranean Games in Tarragona, Spain from the 22 June to 1 July 2018.

Medal summary

Medal table 

|  style="text-align:left; width:78%; vertical-align:top;"|

|  style="text-align:left; width:22%; vertical-align:top;"|

Athletics 

Women
Track events

Beach volleyball

Men

Boules

Lyonnaise

Pétanque

Boxing 

Men

Equestrian 

Jumping

Gymnastics 
  Artistic gymnastics

Men

Judo 

Men

Rowing 

Men

Sailing

Swimming 

Women

Table tennis

Tennis 

Men

Water skiing

References

Nations at the 2018 Mediterranean Games
2018
Mediterranean Games